Five is a 2016 French comedy film, written and directed by Igor Gotesman and starring Pierre Niney.

Plot
The film is about a group of five childhood friends who take up the opportunity to live together in an expensive Paris apartment. In order to fund the group's lifestyle, Pierre Niney's character, Samuel, becomes a drug dealer.

Cast

 Pierre Niney - Samuel
 François Civil - Timothée
 Igor Gotesman - Vadim
 Margot Bancilhon - Julia
 Idrissa Hanrot - Nestor
 Pascal Demolon - Barnabé
 Michèle Moretti - Madame Simone
 Bruno Lochet - Gérard
 Lucie Boujenah - Maïa 
 Lise Lamétrie - Chantale
 Fanny Ardant - Herself
 Louise Coldefy - Emilie

Reception
The Hollywood Reporter compared the film's humour to that of recent American comedies, calling the film "a lively and often rather funny affair, dishing out oodles of sex, drugs and hip-hop, with plenty of below-the-belt humor a l’americaine. Indeed, Five simply wouldn’t exist without The Hangover, Neighbors and Superbad," and adding, "Five never manages to convince in the plot department, though it moves so fast we barely have any time to think about it."

The film has received mixed reviews in the French-language press. L'Obs criticised the film's casting and its crass humour, while Les Inrocks criticised the film for its attitude towards the characters' lifestyle and for its consumerism. Télérama, by contrast, described the film as well written, singling out the performances of Pierre Niney and François Civil for particular praise; L'Express likewise praised these two actors, stating that Civil was the revelation of the film.

References

External links

2016 films
2016 comedy films
2010s French-language films
French comedy films
Films about drugs
2016 directorial debut films
2010s French films